Sudra may refer to:

 Shudra, one of the Varnas in the traditional four-section division in the Hindu caste system
 Sudra Kingdom, one of the kingdoms of ancient India mentioned in the epic Mahabharata
 Sudarium,  a Latin word, literally meaning 'sweat cloth', used for wiping the face clean and now associated with Christian liturgical usage and art
 Sedreh, sure or sudra, a garment worn by Zoroastrians
 Sudra, a planet in Axiom Verge, where the events of the game take place
 Sudra (headdress), a traditional Jewish headdress